The Ambassador of Conscience Award is Amnesty International's most prestigious human rights award. It celebrates individuals and groups who have furthered the cause of human rights by showing exceptional courage standing up to injustice and who have used their talents to inspire others.
It also aims to generate debate, encourage public action and raise awareness of inspirational stories and human rights issues. The award ceremonies were organised by Art for Amnesty CLG (now Art for Human Rights CLG) on behalf of Amnesty International up to 2016. 

The award was conceived and created by in 2003 by Bill Shipsey, a founder of Art for Amnesty (now Art for Human Rights). The Award was inspired by a poem written by Seamus Heaney for Amnesty International in 1985. The poem, "From the Republic of Conscience" ends with the lines:"Their embassies he said, were everywhere but operated independently and no ambassador would ever be relieved".

Recipients
 2003 - Václav Havel, former President of the Czech Republic
 2004 - Mary Robinson, former President of Ireland and UN High Commissioner for Human Rights, and Hilda Morales Trujillo, Guatemalan women's rights activist
 2005 - Irish rock band U2 and their manager Paul McGuinness 
 2006 - Nelson Mandela, former President of South Africa
 2008 - Peter Gabriel, musician and humanitarian activist 
 2009 - Aung San Suu Kyi, leader of the Burmese National League for Democracy. The award was subsequently withdrawn on 12 November 2018.
 2013 - Malala Yousafzai, Pupil, blogger, activist, and Harry Belafonte, American singer, human right and social justice activist 
 2015 - Joan Baez, American folk singer, songwriter and activist and Ai Weiwei, Chinese contemporary artist and activist
 2016 - Angélique Kidjo, Beninese singer-songwriter and Lutte Pour Le Changement (LUCHA), a youth movement committed to peaceful protest in Goma and Le Balai Citoyen, a political grassroots movement in Burkina Faso and Y'en a Marre, a group of Senegalese rappers and journalists 
 2017 - Alicia Keys, American musician and activist; the movement for rights for indigenous people in Canada
 2018 - Colin Kaepernick, former NFL quarterback and activist;  kneeling protest at racial injustice
 2019 - Greta Thunberg, Swedish environment activist and the Fridays for Future Movement, part of School strike for climate

References

External links
 Amnesty International Ambassador of Conscience Award site

Human rights awards
Awards established in 2003
Amnesty International